The Arrival of Kenny Dorham is a jazz studio album by Kenny Dorham, recorded and release in 1960. Initially released by Jaro Records, it would be reissued on the Xanadu label in 1975 as The Kenny Dorham Memorial Album with a different artwork.

Reception
The Allmusic review by Scott Yanow stated: "The straight-ahead music includes features for Davis and Warren, but Dorham consistently takes honors".

Track listing

"Stage West" - 8:20
"I'm an Old Cowhand" - 4:09
"Song of Delilah" - 4:25
"Butch's Blues" - 3:41
"Stella by Starlight" - 5:01
"Lazy Afternoon" - 3:10
"Turbo" - 3:44
"When Sunny Gets Blue" - 4:36
"Six Bits" - 4:45

Personnel

Kenny Dorham - trumpet
Charles Davis - baritone sax
Tommy Flanagan - piano
Butch Warren - bass
Buddy Enlow - drums

References

1960 albums
Kenny Dorham albums
Xanadu Records albums
Albums produced by Don Schlitten